Swallow Rock is a small scenic area in the northwest part of Nanjing, Jiangsu Province, China. Standing at 36 metres in the Yangtze River, the Swallow Rock is shaped like a flying swallow and is also one of three famous rocks in Nanjing. Li Bai is thought to have visited and written a poem about Swallow Rock.

Swallow Rock is also of minor historical interest for several unrelated events. In the Qing dynasty, when the Qianlong Emperor went on an inspection tour in the Jiangnan region, he passed Swallow Rock and left a poem here and that is now displayed on the rocks. On the top of the rock, there is a pavilion with a stone tablet in it. Swallow Rock is one of the 48 scenic areas in Nanjing.

There is also a small monument that marks this as one of the sites where the citizens of Nanjing were slaughtered by the Japanese during the Nanjing Massacre in 1937–38.

There is a station on the Nanjing Metro named after Swallow Rock.

References

Tourist attractions in Nanjing
Geography of Nanjing